Annabel Chaulvin (born 4 July 1965) is a French yacht racer who competed in the 1992 Summer Olympics and in the 1996 Summer Olympics.

References

1965 births
Living people
French female sailors (sport)
Olympic sailors of France
Sailors at the 1992 Summer Olympics – Europe
Sailors at the 1996 Summer Olympics – 470
20th-century French women